The 2008 North Dakota State Bison football team represented North Dakota State University in the 2008 NCAA Division I FCS football season. The team was led by sixth-year head coach Craig Bohl and played their home games at the Fargodome in Fargo, North Dakota. The Bison finished with an overall record of 6–5, tying for third place in the Missouri Valley Football Conference (MVFC) with a 4–4 mark.

Schedule

References

North Dakota State
North Dakota State Bison football seasons
North Dakota State Bison football